Vigilance and Anti-Corruption Bureau, Kerala (VACB) is an agency of Government of Kerala constituted to investigate offences of bribery and corruption falling within the purview of Prevention of Corruption Act, 1988 in the state of Kerala.  The VACB was established in 1964 and operates under the control of the Vigilance Department of the Government of Kerala. The VACB has its headquarters in Thiruvananthapuram, the capital city of Kerala, and has several regional offices across the state.

As the sole specialized agency in Kerala which investigates corruption offences, the Vigilance & Anti-Corruption Bureau ensures that offenders are brought to justice and it constantly and continuously strives to keep Kerala corruption-free. Pinarayi Vijayan is the current minister for vigilance. Manoj Abraham is the current Vigilance Director.

Organization
The Vigilance & Anti-Corruption Bureau which was established in 1964 as a separate department under the Administrative Control of a Director to deal exclusively with the investigation of corruption cases utilizing Police personnel and its own executive Staffs. The Vigilance & Anti-corruption Bureau is headed by the Director who is of the rank of Director General of Police or Additional Director General of Police. This position is also known as Vigilance Director. The Director is to be assisted by four Officers of the rank of Additional Director General of Police to Deputy Inspector General of Police. The current Vigilance Director is Sri Manoj Abraham IPS, who is an ADGP in Kerala Police. The Vigilance & Anti-Corruption Bureau headquarters is located at Thiruvananthapuram City. The VACB Headquarters is the office of the Director, Vigilance & Anti-Corruption Bureau. For the convenience of administration, the State of Kerala is divided into four ranges headed by a Superintendent of Police. A range consists three or more units. A range is further divided into units, There are fourteen VACB Units in 14 districts of Kerala. Each unit has jurisdiction over the respective revenue districts. Each unit is headed by an officer of the rank of Deputy Superintendent of Police. He/She is assisted by Inspectors of Police, Sub Inspectors of Police, Assistant Sub Inspectors and Civil Police Officers.
Southern Range = Thiruvananthapuram Unit, Kollam Unit and Pathanamthitta Unit
Eastern Range = Kottayam Unit, Idukki Unit and Alappuzha Unit
Central Range = Ernakulam Unit, Thrissur Unit and Palakkad Unit
Northern Range = Kozhikode Unit, Malappuram Unit, Wayanad Unit, Kannur Unit and Kasaragod Unit.

Functions

The primary function of the VACB is to investigate corruption and malpractices in government departments, public sector undertakings, and local self-government institutions in Kerala. The VACB receives complaints from the public and also initiates suo-motu inquiries based on media reports or other sources of information. The VACB investigates cases of bribery, embezzlement, misuse of public funds, abuse of power, and other acts of corruption.

The VACB also conducts preventive measures to prevent corruption and malpractices in government institutions. The VACB conducts surprise inspections and raids on government offices and also conducts awareness programs for government officials and the general public on the harmful effects of corruption.

The VACB conducts Investigation/Enquiries into the following types of allegations involving Government Servants and Public Servants including those working in the Public Sector Undertakings of the State Government.
 Criminal misconduct of Public Servants as defined in PC Act 1988.
 Dishonest or improper conduct or abuse of power by Public Servants.
 Gross dereliction of duty or negligence.
 Misappropriation of public funds.
 Amassment of wealth disproportionate to the known sources of income.
 Misuse of Public money or property.
 Preventive vigilance actions and activities.
apart from this the bureau also conducts Vigilance Enquiries, Quick Verifications, Confidential Verifications and Surprise Checks. The bureau also collects intelligence reports on corrupt officials and maintains their records. The VACB launched whatsapp portal for reporting corruptions and complaints. The Whatsapp number is 9447789100.

Notable cases

 Bar bribery scam
 Palarivattom Flyover Scam
 Palmolein Oil Import Scam

Courts and Tribunals
The VACB files cases against the accused in special courts and tribunals set up exclusively to handle corruption-related cases. These courts and tribunals are commonly known as Vigilance Courts or Special Courts.

There are several Vigilance Courts and Tribunals in Kerala that are empowered to hear and dispose of corruption cases. These courts and tribunals are established under the Kerala Lok Ayukta Act, 1999, and the Prevention of Corruption Act, 1988.

Special Judge (Vigilance), Thiruvananthapuram: This court has jurisdiction over cases registered by the VACB in Thiruvananthapuram district.

Special Judge (Vigilance), Ernakulam: This court has jurisdiction over cases registered by the VACB in Ernakulam district.

Special Judge (Vigilance), Kozhikode: This court has jurisdiction over cases registered by the VACB in Kozhikode district. 

Special Judge (Vigilance), Thrissur: This court has jurisdiction over cases registered by the VACB in Thrissur district.

Special Judge (Vigilance), Kannur: This court has jurisdiction over cases registered by the VACB in Kannur district.

Special Court for Corruption Cases, Kochi: This court has jurisdiction over cases registered by the VACB in the Kochi City Police Commissionerate area.

Vigilance Tribunal, Thiruvananthapuram: This tribunal hears appeals against the orders of the VACB regarding departmental proceedings against government officials.

Apart from these courts and tribunals, the VACB also has the power to file cases against elected representatives in the High Court of Kerala, as per the directions of the Lok Ayukta. The Lok Ayukta is an independent ombudsman appointed by the state government to investigate cases of corruption against public officials. In conclusion, the Vigilance Courts and Tribunals in Kerala play a crucial role in ensuring that corrupt officials are brought to justice. These courts and tribunals provide a speedy and effective mechanism to deal with corruption cases, and their establishment is a significant step towards promoting transparency and accountability in government institutions.

Initiatives 
The VACB has set up a toll-free number "1064" for the public to report corruption, mismanagement, nepotism and bribery by government officials. Apart from that, a system has been set-up to report corruption on WhatsApp and website;- http://publicvigil.in

 Operation "JASOOS" 
 The VACB has conducted flash raids at 53 Regional Transport Offices as part of ‘Operation Jasoos’.

Controversies 
The VACB has faced criticism for its slow pace of investigation and lack of coordination with other law enforcement agencies. The VACB has also been accused of selective targeting of individuals and political bias in its investigations. The VACB has been accused of conducting politically motivated investigations and framing individuals based on false charges.

In conclusion, the Vigilance and Anti Corruption Bureau of Kerala has played a crucial role in combating corruption and malpractices in government institutions in Kerala. Despite its successes, the VACB continues to face several challenges in its fight against corruption, and there is a need for greater transparency and accountability in its operations. The VACB must strive to maintain its independence and integrity and ensure that its investigations are conducted impartially and without any political bias.

Former chiefs 

 MR Ajith Kumar IPS
 Anil Kant IPS
 B. Syed Mohammed Yasin IPS
 Loknath behra IPS
 Jacob Thomas IPS
 TP. Senkumar IPS
 Jacob Punnoose IPS

See also

Government of Kerala
 Kerala Lokayukta
 Kerala Lok Adalat
 Corruption in Kerala
 Prevention of Corruption Act, 1988
 Crime Branch

References

Anti-corruption agencies
Government of Kerala
1964 establishments in Kerala
Corruption in Kerala